The pachysolen tannophilus nuclear code (translation table 26) is a genetic code found in the ascomycete fungus Pachysolen tannophilus.

Code

Differences from the standard code

Initiation codons
This code uses the initiation codons AUG, GUG and UUG.

Systematic range and comments
 Pachysolen tannophilus

See also
 List of genetic codes

References

Molecular genetics
Gene expression
Protein biosynthesis